The Conspicuous Service Cross (CSC) is a decoration (medal) of the Australian honours system. It is awarded to members of the Australian Defence Force "for outstanding devotion to duty or outstanding achievement in the application of exceptional skills, judgment or dedication, in non-warlike situations". In November 2019, 1129 people were listed as recipients. All ranks are eligible for the award.

History 
The Conspicuous Service Cross was introduced in 1989 to acknowledge outstanding achievement and performance of duty in non-warlike circumstances. Previously, there had been no option for such recognition other than using awards within the Order of Australia.

Description
 The medal is a nickel-silver modified Maltese Cross with each axis measuring 38 millimetres, ensigned with the Crown of Saint Edward in nickel-silver, with the arms of the cross interspersed with fluted rays. The obverse bears a central device of the Southern Cross surrounded by a laurel wreath.
 The back of the cross shows a horizontal panel.
 The ribbon is 32 millimetres wide, having alternating diagonal stripes of bush green and sandy gold 6 millimetres wide.
 Additional awards of the CSC wear a nickel-silver bar with a superimposed replica of the cross. The bar is attached to the ribbon of the original award.

Multiple award recipients
Several people have received the Conspicuous Service Cross for a second time, including:

See also
 Australian Honours Order of Wearing
 Post-nominal letters (Australia)
 :Category:Recipients of the Conspicuous Service Cross (Australia)

Notes

References

External links
 It's an Honour - Australian government website

Military awards and decorations of Australia

1989 establishments in Australia
Awards established in 1989